Dublin, Wicklow and Wexford Railway (DW&WR) 17 (Wicklow) 0-6-0 was built was in 1899 at Grand Canal Street railway works and was followed by the slightly larger No. 36 (Wexford) in 1901.

History
No. 17 certainly contained some part from the withdrawn 0-4-2 previously having the same number.  No. 36 had larger cylinders and the Dublin and South Eastern Railway (DSER) trialled it with a Phoenix superheater between 1911 and 1915.  Comparison trials on freight trains showed No. 36 had 20% more power than No. 17 in this form.  Despite this the DSER was to wait until the 2-6-0 moguls  Nos. 15 and 16 in 1922 before making further use of superheating.  On amalgamation to Great Southern Railways (GSR) in 1925 they were allocated to the single member classes 440/J20 and 441/J14 and renumbered as per the class.  The GSR kept them for 4 and 10 years respectively before withdrawal.

Harcourt Street Crash
Engine number 17 Wicklow, about a year old at the time, was the engine involved in the  crash on 14 February 1900 (Valentine's Day) in which the locomotive driver was unfortunate to have his arm amputated below the shoulder.

References

0-6-0 locomotives
5 ft 3 in gauge locomotives
Railway locomotives introduced in 1899
Scrapped locomotives
Steam locomotives of Ireland